Robin Söderling was the defending champion, but he competed in the BNP Paribas Open instead.
Florian Mayer won in the final 6–4, 6–4, against Gilles Simon.

Seeds

Draw

Finals

Top half

Bottom half

External links
 Main Draw
 Qualifying Draw

2010 ATP Challenger Tour
2010,Singles